Greece participated with a team of 26 athletes (10 men, 16 women) at the 2001 World Championships in Athletics in Edmonton, Alberta, Canada.

Medals

Results

See also
Greece at the IAAF World Championships in Athletics

References

http://www.contra.gr/Sports/TrackandField/apo-to-elsinki-sth-mosxa.2365802.html

2001
World Championships in Athletics
Nations at the 2001 World Championships in Athletics